OPTSAT-3000 (OPTical SATellite-3000), or SHALOM (Spaceborne Hyperspectral Applicative Land and Ocean Mission) is an Italian Earth observation and reconnaissance satellite developed and built by Israel Aerospace Industries and operated by the Italian Ministry of Defence. Launched on August 2, 2017, it has an expected service life of at least 7 years. It is based on the design of the TecSAR-1 satellite.

Design

Satellite bus 
OPTSAT-3000 is based upon the bus of the Israeli reconnaissance satellite TecSAR-1, but is modified for optical instruments.

Imaging system 
OPTSAT-3000 has a high-resolution optical imaging system known as Jupiter, which is able to deliver panchromatic images with a resolution of  while operating the multispectral channel at the same time.

Launch 

OPTSAT-3000 launched from Guiana Space Centre ELV, French Guiana, on board a Vega rocket.

See also 
VENµS

References 

2017 in spaceflight
Spacecraft launched in 2017
Reconnaissance satellites
Earth observation satellites
Satellites of Italy
IAI satellites
Satellites in low Earth orbit